is a private junior college in Hakodate, Hokkaido, Japan, established in 1963.

External links
 Official website 

Educational institutions established in 1963
Private universities and colleges in Japan
Universities and colleges in Hokkaido
Japanese junior colleges
1963 establishments in Japan